Without You is the fourth extended play (EP) by American singer Lauv. It was released on June 24, 2020 by AWAL.

Background
The EP contains five tracks. They were all written and produced during quarantine. A music video for the only single, "Dishes", was also released. The music video shows Lauv in his kitchen with dishes around him. He then sings how great it was when he had his significant other. A line from the song gave the EP the name, Without You.

Track listing 
Track listing adapted from the Apple Music and Tidal.

References 

2020 EPs
Lauv albums